Doug Sutherland may refer to:

 Doug Sutherland (American politician), American politician
 Doug Sutherland (American football) (born 1948), former NFL player
 Doug Sutherland (Australian politician) (born 1932), former Sydney Mayor
 Douglas Sutherland (1919–1995), British author and journalist